Xenochroa xanthia is a moth of the family Nolidae first described by George Hampson in 1902. It is found in the north-eastern parts of the Himalayas, Singapore, Sumatra, Borneo and Palawan. It is found in lowland forests.

References

Chloephorinae